Greg Ellingson (born December 30, 1988) is an American professional Canadian football wide receiver for the Montreal Alouettes of the Canadian Football League (CFL). He played college football at Florida International. He has also been a member of the Jacksonville Jaguars, New Orleans VooDoo, Tampa Bay Buccaneers, Tampa Bay Storm, Hamilton Tiger-Cats, Ottawa Redblacks, Edmonton Elks, and Winnipeg Blue Bombers.

Professional career

Jacksonville Jaguars
He was signed by the Jacksonville Jaguars as an undrafted free agent in 2011. He was waived from the Jacksonville Jaguars on August 29, 2011.

New Orleans Voodoo
Ellingson played for the New Orleans Voodoo of the Arena Football League in early 2012. In 5 games, Ellingson recorded 33 catches for 475 yards and 8 touchdowns.

Tampa Bay Buccaneers
He was signed by the Tampa Bay Buccaneers after the release of Tyler Shoemaker on May 22, 2012. He was subsequently released by the Bucs prior to playing in any regular season games.

Tampa Bay Storm
Remaining in the Tampa Bay area, Ellingson returned to the arena game to start 2013, playing for the Tampa Bay Storm. In 10 games, Ellingson's 71 catches produced 987 yards and 16 touchdowns, attracting interest from Canadian teams.

Hamilton Tiger-Cats
Greg Ellingson signed with the Hamilton Tiger-Cats of the Canadian Football League on May 30, 2013, in time for the 2013 CFL season. Ellingson led all receivers in the Tiger-Cats' second preseason game against the Winnipeg Blue Bombers with two catches for 84 yards and a touchdown. His touchdown came on a 58-yard strike from quarterback Henry Burris in the second quarter. The Tiger-Cats won the game 52–0.

Ellingson made his CFL regular season debut on June 28 versus the Toronto Argonauts at the Rogers Centre, and finished second on the team with six catches for 120 yards. The Tiger-Cats lost the game 39–34. Ellingson's first career CFL touchdown came on July 27, 2013, when he caught a 39-yard pass from Burris in the second quarter of a game against the Saskatchewan Roughriders. He went on to lead the Ticats in catches (5) and yards (114) in the 32 – 20 loss. Ellingson played in 12 consecutive games of the CFL season and was having an outstanding rookie campaign. He missed the final 6 games of the regular season with an injury, prior to his injury he was on pace for a 1200-yard season (66.6 yards per game). Ellingson appeared in all 3 of the Ti-Cats post-season games totaling 114 yards on 11 receptions, one of which was for a touchdown. The Tiger-Cats lost in the 101st Grey Cup to the Roughriders.

His second season in the CFL was also cut short due to injury. Ellingson only managed to play in 7 of the 18 regular season games, and also missed out on the Tiger-Cats 2 playoff games. Ellingson managed to rack up 429 receiving yards on 32 catches.

Ottawa Redblacks
Upon entering free agency, Ellingson signed with the Ottawa Redblacks on February 11, 2015. Ellingson had an exceptional 2015 CFL season, setting career highs in every major category. He played in all 18 regular season games, catching 69 passes for 1,071 yards with 9 touchdowns. In the Eastern Final Ellingson had a career day racking up 186 yards on 5 catches with 1 touchdown: His touchdown came with only 1:20 to go in the 4th quarter. On 2nd down and 25 from Ottawa's own 17 yard line, Burris flung the ball down the sideline where Ellingson caught the ball, evaded the defensive back, and ran all the way to the endzone for a 93-yard completion. The catch put the RedBlacks into their first ever Grey Cup game. Ellingson had a career season in 2016. Ellingson set personal bests in receptions (76) and yards (1,260) and was named a CFL divisional All-Star for the first time in his career.

As a pending free agent, Ellingson had a workout with the Chicago Bears of the NFL in mid-December 2016. Nevertheless, he agreed to a two-year contract with the Redblacks on February 10, 2017: The deal was reportedly worth $210,000 per season. Greg Ellingson had another strong season in 2017, finishing first in the league in receiving touchdowns with 12, and third in the league with 1,459 receiving yards. His 96 receptions that year was the most all-time by any of the Ottawa CFL clubs. His production was awarded when he was named a CFL All-Star for the first time in his five-year career. Ellingson continued his strong play in 2018, catching 91 passes for 1,086 yards with 5 touchdowns. Following the season, on December 1, 2018, Ellingson was charged with failing to provide a breath sample. The Redblacks subsequently barred Ellingson from participating in team activities until they had time to investigate the matter.

Edmonton Eskimos/Elks
Ellingson signed with Edmonton during the 2019 free agency period, after Ottawa General Manager Marcel Desjardins failed to contact him until free agency had opened, and tried to offer him less money than the previous season. Edmonton also signed quarterback Trevor Harris and offensive tackle SirVincent Rogers from Ottawa; Harris also had received little word from Desjardins, and had been involved in a contract dispute the previous season. Ellingson continued his chemistry with Harris, recording his 5th consecutive season with at least 1,000 yards receiving, to go along with 5 more scores. Edmonton reached the Eastern Final as a crossover team, but were defeated. Nevertheless, Ellingson was named a divisional All-Star, his first Western Division honours.

Ellingson did not play in 2020 due to the cancellation of the 2020 CFL season and re-signed with Edmonton on January 30, 2021. He played in ten regular season games where he had 47 receptions for 687 yards and one touchdown in 2021. He became a free agent upon the expiry of his contract on February 8, 2022.

Winnipeg Blue Bombers
On February 8, 2022, it was announced that Ellingson had signed with the Winnipeg Blue Bombers to a one-year contract. He played and started in just eight regular season games as he dealt with injuries throughout the season, but still managed to record 38 receptions for 598 yards and three touchdowns. Ellingson played in both post-season games, including the 109th Grey Cup game, where he had four receptions for 46 yards, but the Blue Bombers lost to the Toronto Argonauts. He became a free agent on February 14, 2023.

Montreal Alouettes
On February 15, 2023, it was announced that Ellingson had signed a one-year contract with the Montreal Alouettes.

Career statistics

CFL receiving stats

Arena Football League receiving stats

References

External links

 Montreal Alouettes bio
 Greg Ellingson, DS #95 WR, Florida International

1988 births
Living people
American football wide receivers
FIU Panthers football players
Florida International University alumni
Hamilton Tiger-Cats players
New Orleans VooDoo players
Ottawa Redblacks players
Players of American football from Tampa, Florida
Players of Canadian football from Tampa, Florida
Tampa Bay Storm players
Edmonton Elks players
Winnipeg Blue Bombers players
Montreal Alouettes players